The St Leonards Academy is a coeducational secondary school with academy status, located in the St Leonards-on-Sea area of Hastings in East Sussex.

The St Leonards Academy was established in September 2011 from a merger of Filsham Valley School and The Grove School. The school operates on the Filsham Valley site on Edinburgh Road, and continues to coordinate with East Sussex County Council for admissions. The school is federated with Hastings Academy in the form of The Hastings Academies Trust.

The school is sponsored by the University of Brighton, British Telecom, and East Sussex County Council, and has specialisms in mathematics and ICT (Information and Communications Technology). It offers GCSEs and BTECs as programmes of study for pupils.

References

External links
The St Leonards Academy official website

Secondary schools in East Sussex
Hastings
Academies in East Sussex